Bahrami-ye Sofla (also Romanized as Bahrāmī-ye Soflá; also known as Bahrāmī and Bahrāmī-ye Pā’īn) is a village in Eslamabad Rural District, in the Central District of Jiroft County, Kerman Province, Iran. At the 2006 census, its population was 189, in 38 families.

References 

Populated places in Jiroft County